The Headies 2011 was the 6th edition of the Hip Hop World Awards. The award's name was officially changed to "The Headies". The ceremony was hosted by Rita Dominic and eLDee. It was held on October 22, 2011, at the Eko Hotel and Suites in Victoria Island, Lagos. 2face Idibia won three awards, including Artiste of the Year. Darey's "The Way You Are" won for Best R&B Single and Recording of the Year. M.I and Ice Prince won two awards apiece. Don Jazzy and Dr SID both took home an award. Capital Femi walked away with the Best Vocal Performance (Male) award. Wizkid won the Next Rated category and received a Hyundai Sonata at a later date. Waje was the only female awardee. The Hall of Fame award went to Jùjú musician Shina Peters. A total of twenty-one cart gold plaques were handed out.

Performers
Olamide
Waje
Sound Sultan
Shina Peters
Omawumi
Ice Prince
Brymo
M.I
Dr SID
Tiwa Savage
Wizkid

Winners and nominees

References

2011 music awards
2011 in Nigerian music
The Headies